The manuscript 4Q127 (TM 69054, LDAB 10345) is one of the Dead Sea Scrolls. It is probably a paraphrase of Exodus according to the Septuagint (LXX) of the biblical Book of Leviticus, found at Qumran (Cave No. 4). The Rahlfs-No. is 802. Palaeographically it dates from the first century BC. Currently the manuscript is housed in the Rockefeller Museum in Jerusalem.

Description 

According to Devorah Dimant, the manuscript "4Q127 is not biblical, but contain some other texts". She also says that "4Q127 was labeled by the editor a paraphrase of Exous. Elsewhere, I have suggested that 4Q127 is, in fact, an apocryphal work with a visionary recapitulation of history".

Anthony Meyer states:

References

Bibliography 

 Skehan, Ulrich, Sanderson 1992. DJD 9: 223–242.

1946 archaeological discoveries
1st-century biblical manuscripts
1st-century BC biblical manuscripts
Book of Isaiah
Dead Sea Scrolls